Gentry Densely is an American singer, guitarist and songwriter. A longtime fixture on Salt Lake City, Utah's punk, metal and experimental music scenes, Densely has been involved in numerous bands but is best known for leading the groups Iceburn, Ascend and Eagle Twin. Critic Gregory Heaney describes him as "One of music's great scientists".

Biography 
A Salt Lake City native, Densley is a graduate of the University of Utah in music composition. His first notable group was Iceburn (1991–2001), which initially started as a punk/metal power trio with progressive rock flourishes before moving into free jazz and free improvisation. During the Iceburn era, Densley became friends with Greg Anderson; Iceburn released a split e.p. with Anderson's group Engine Kid before Anderson formed of Goatsnake and Sunn O))). The pair later collaborated in the experimental doom metal project Ascend.

In 2007 Densley formed Eagle Twin, who released their debut on Southern Lord Recordings in 2009.

His younger brother, Tyler Densley, was the singer for hardcore band Lewd Acts.

References

Year of birth missing (living people)
Living people
American male singers
American heavy metal singers
American heavy metal guitarists
American male songwriters
20th-century American composers
Musicians from Salt Lake City
University of Utah alumni
Guitarists from Utah
Songwriters from Utah
American male guitarists
20th-century American guitarists
20th-century American male musicians